The Battle of Tacuarembó was a battle between the Luso-Brazilian forces under the command of José de Castelo Branco Correia, Count of Figueira, and  the Artiguist forces of Andrés Latorre in Tacuarembó, modern-day Uruguay.

The encounter resulted in a catastrophe for the Artiguist army. Indeed, out of 2,500 men, 500 were killed and 505 were captured, while the Luso-Brazilian forces only had 6 casualties (1 soldier killed and 5 wounded).

Due to the complete annihilation of Latorre's forces, the battle was a severe blow to the independentist cause and determined the victory of the United Kingdom of Portugal, Brazil and the Algarves in the war.

See also

Portuguese conquest of the Banda Oriental

References

Citations

Bibliography
 
 
 
 

Colonial Uruguay
Tacuarembó Department
Tacuarembo
Tacuarembo
Tacuarembo
Conflicts in 1820
1820 in Uruguay
1820 in the Portuguese Empire